Oi! the Boat Records is an independent record label based in Lafayette, Indiana. The label was started as a digital distribution only record label to release Yakimick's former bands' early recordings.  It has since evolved into an internationally recognized independent label with a back catalog of vinyl and digital releases from both established and relatively unknown acts from half a dozen countries worldwide.

The label specializes in punk, oi!, ska, and hardcore bands.

History

Early Days

Growth
In 2009, the label released its first vinyl output:  a split 7-inch vinyl EP with Stamford Bridge (Carl Fritcher from iconic US Oi! band The Templars (band)) and Bastards Choir.   In 2009, Max Campbell of Bastards Choir and Hudson Falcons joined Yakimick as co-owner of Oi! the Boat.

In 2010, the label released the popular Swedish Oi! band Perkele's EP entitled "Punk Rock Army" through a collaboration with Germany's Bandworm Records who had previously rereleased Yakimicks former band Brassknuckle Boys LP "Songs About Fighting" on vinyl.

Gaining notoriety
In late 2010, Lars Frederiksen of punk band Rancid and Lars Frederiksen and the Bastards contacted Oi! the Boat Records about the possibility of releasing music by his new Oi! band, The Old Firm Casuals.  To date, Oi! the Boat has released 3 EPs by the band, including a split double 7-inch vinyl EP with the seminal UK Oi! band The Last Resort

Discography
OTB#1  Brassknuckle Boys "Songs About Fighting" (digital
OTB#2  Green Room Rockers "Hoosier Homegrown" (digital)
OTB#3  Hudson Falcons 'Desire to Burn' (digital)
OTB#4  Stamford Bridge / Bastards Choir (split 7-inch)
OTB#5  The Cliches (digital(deleted))
OTB#6  Green Room Rockers "Green Room Rockers" (digital)
OTB#7  Perkele "Punk Rock Army" (7-inch)
OTB#8  Minivan "Shake My Shakes Away" (7-inch)
OTB#9  The Old Firm Casuals S/T (7-inch)
OTB#10 Armed Suspects & Broken Heroes "For the Punks & Skins" 12-inch
OTB#11 The Last Resort / The Old Firm Casuals -Split (double 7-inch)
OTB#12 Unit Six "Infection" (7-inch)
OTB#13 Noi!se / Gestalts split (7-inch)
OTB#14 The Old Firm Casuals "Army of One" (7-inch)
OTB#15 Peter and the Test Tube Babies / Pennycocks split EP (7-inch)
OTB#16 Whiskey Rebels "These Inside Jokes Are Killing Me" (12-inch)
OTB#17 Brassknuckle Boys / Stomper 98 split EP (7-inch)
OTB#18 Hooligan "No Blacks, No Irish, No Dogs" EP (7-inch)
OTB#19 Cold Feelings "American Industry LP (12-inch)
OTB#20 VOi!CE of America Vol. 1 V/A EP (7-inch)
OTB#21 Victory "Laced Up" (7-inch)
OTB#22 The Old Firm Casuals "For the Love of it All..." Double LP/CD
OTB#23 Victory "Twin Cities" EP (7-inch)
OTB#24 VOi!CE of America Vol. 2 V/A EP (7-inch)
OTB#25 Brick Assassin - "Chicago Brick Crew" (7-inch)
OTB#26 Die Tring! "Die Trying" (7-inch)
OTB#27 VOi!CE of America Vol. 3 V/A EP (7-inch)
OTB#28 Victory / Brick Assassin "Best of Midwest Oi!" (7-inch)
OTB#29 Duffy's Cut "Duffy's Cut"  (12-inch/CD)
OTB#30 Anger Flares (7-inch)
OTB#31 Oxley's Midnight Runners (in production)
OTB#32 Hooligan "Criminal Damage (7-inch)

References

 [BBC] [Radio 1] Punk Show w/ [Mike Davies (broadcaster)] April 12, 2011
 [Thrasher (magazine)] February 2012
 AMP April 2011
Big Cheese Magazine February 15, 2011
Dying Scene 2/23/2011, 3/12/2011, 4/25/2011, 5/10,2011, 6/27/2011, 11/25/2011, 12/3/2011
Punk News 2/14/2011, 6/21/2011
Louder Than War 3/13/2011
Oi! the Boat Official website, discography.  Accessed 5/13/2013

External links

American record labels
Companies based in Indiana
Punk record labels
Record labels established in 2007